
Gmina Ujsoły is a rural gmina (administrative district) in Żywiec County, Silesian Voivodeship, in southern Poland, on the Slovak border.

Villages
Gmina Ujsoły contains the villages and settlements of Cicha, Danielka, Glinka, Herdula, Kotrysia Polana, Kręcichłosty, Młada Hora, Okrągłe, Smereków Wielki, Soblówka, Stawiska, Szczytkówka, Ujsoły and Złatna.

Neighbouring gminas
Gmina Ujsoły is bordered by the gminas of Jeleśnia, Milówka, Rajcza and Węgierska Górka. It also borders Slovakia.

References

Ujsoly
Żywiec County